Kathlyn M. (Kara) Cooney is an Egyptologist, archaeologist, professor of Egyptian Art and Architecture at UCLA and chair of the Department of Near Eastern Language and Cultures at UCLA. As well as for her scholarly work, she is known for hosting television shows on ancient Egypt on the Discovery Channel as well as for writing a popular-press book on the subject. She specialises in craft production, coffin studies, and economies in the ancient world.

Education and career
Raised in Houston, she obtained her Bachelor of Arts in German and Humanities from the University of Texas in Austin in 1994. She was awarded a PhD in 2002 by Johns Hopkins University for Near Eastern Studies. She was part of an archaeological team excavating at the artisans' village of Deir el Medina in Egypt, as well as Dahshur and various tombs at Thebes. In 2002 she was Kress Fellow at the National Gallery of Art and worked on the preparation of the Cairo Museum exhibition Quest for Immortality: Treasures of Ancient Egypt.  After a temporary one-year position at UCLA, she took a three-year postdoctoral teaching position at Stanford University, during which, In 2005, she acted as fellow curator for Tutankhamun and the Golden Age of the Pharaohs at the Los Angeles County Museum of Art. She also worked for two years at the Getty Center before landing a tenure-track position at UCLA in 2009. Cooney's current research in coffin reuse, primarily focusing on the 20th Dynasty, is ongoing. Her research investigates the socioeconomic and political turmoil that have plagued the period, ultimately affecting funerary and burial practices in ancient Egypt. 
She currently resides in Los Angeles.

Television
She hosted two Discovery Channel documentary series: Out of Egypt, first aired in August 2009, and Egypt's Lost Queen, which also featured Zahi Hawass.

Books

Personal 
Cooney's paternal grandparents were from County Cork in Ireland. She is named after her Irish-Protestant grandmother Kathlyn Mary, who was disowned by her family for marrying Cooney’s Irish-Catholic grandfather James.
Her mother is Italian, her grandmother was from the Abruzzi region, and her grandfather from Naples. She uses the name Kathlyn for her scholarly work, and her nickname Kara for professional but non-academic work.

References

External links 
 Interview with Kara Cooney

Living people
American Egyptologists
Year of birth missing (living people)
American expatriates in Egypt
Johns Hopkins University alumni
University of California, Los Angeles faculty
American women archaeologists
21st-century American women